The Titusville Herald was a five-day morning daily newspaper published in Titusville, Pennsylvania, which covers news in Crawford County. Founded on June 14, 1865, it was the oldest daily newspaper in the Pennsylvania Oil Region until it ceased print on November 5, 2022.

History 
The Titusville Morning Herald was founded on June 14, 1865 by brothers William and Henry Bloss. William Bloss, born in Rochester on March 25, 1831, was both a newspaperman and an abolitionist. After serving in the American Civil War, he migrated to Western Pennsylvania in search of opportunities in the burgeoning oil industry. William, joined by his brother Henry, purchased the Titusville Gazette and Oil Creek Reporter in 1865. The brothers regularly disagreed both about management of the paper In 1872, Henry and his partner, J. H. Cogwell, bought William's share of the newspaper. Henry continued to grow the paper, purchasing various other local newspapers including The Evening Courier, The Evening Club, The Evening Journal, The Morning Star, The Evening Press, The Evening News, and The Daily Courier.

The paper chronicled the oil industry as it developed in the wake of the discovery of petroleum in Oil Creek and its extraction with the establishment of Drake Well in 1859 by Colonel Edwin Drake. The Herald  provided coverage of oil prices along Oil Creek and chronicled the establishment of the Oil Creek Railroad in 1865.

The Titusville Morning Herald also covered social issues affecting Titusville, a town that had grown exponentially in size and population during the oil boom. The paper features stories on gangs, prostitution and arson. When a devastating fire broke out in 1866, which devastated commercial buildings downtown (though sparing the Herald offices), Henry Bloss and the other editors recommended lynching those found culpable.

When Henry Bloss died in 1893, his wife Sarah ran the paper until her death in 1916. Their son, Joseph Bloss, took over the paper and ran it until 1921. After Joseph's tenure as editor, the Herald was sold to Edgar Taft Stevenson. Edgar Stevenson, called "the newspaper man's newspaper man," edited the newspaper until he died in 1956. The Stevenson family published the paper for the next few generations.

Since 1993, Michael Sample was the publisher until his death on Jan. 3, 2022. The paper ceased and printed its last issue on November 5, 2022.

References

External links 

 The Titusville Herald website

Newspapers published in Pennsylvania
Titusville, Pennsylvania
1865 establishments in Pennsylvania
Publications established in 1865
Defunct newspapers published in Pennsylvania
2022 disestablishments in Pennsylvania